Campanula lanata, the woolly bellflower, is a biennial herb belonging to the family Campanulaceae.

Description
It is very hairy (hence the common name).

Distribution
Campanula lanata is endemic to Serbia and west and central Bulgaria.

References

lanata